Frank Douglas Garrett A graduate of Mackenzie High in Detroit. An all-star Detroit Michigan basketball player selected in 1961 and 1962. A USMC Basketball All-Star during the years 1964–66; A JUCO All-American Basketball Selection in 1968. Captain of the Detroit College Basketball team in 1969–70. Coaching at the high school and college levels as an assistant and head basketball coach during the 1970s. Holding the rank of Sergeant, he served honorably during the Vietnam Era in the United States Marine Corps.  He later served as an Oakland UniversityDean and Professor of Education. Honored by Governor Daniels as a Distinguished Hoosier and with a key to the city on the town basketball court by his adopted hometown of Odon Indiana during Old Settlers in August 2006. Author of the force of evil published in 2011.

References

 Oakland University faculty
 Living people
 American men's basketball players
 Eastern Michigan University alumni
 Year of birth missing (living people)
People from Daviess County, Indiana